Catfish Keith (born February 9, 1962) is an American acoustic blues singer-songwriter and guitarist.  He is best known as an exponent of the resonator guitar.  He has released several solo albums, including 2001's A Fist Full of Riffs.

The Guardian described him as "a solo revelation" who was "breaking new ground for blues. Twice a Blues Music Award nominee for 'Best Acoustic Blues Album', he has had ten number one independent radio chart hit albums.

Early life and career
Catfish Keith was born Keith Daniel Kozacik in East Chicago, Indiana, and was first inspired by blues music he heard on the radio.  These included songs by Buddy Guy, Howlin' Wolf and Muddy Waters, although by the time he owned a guitar in his teenage years, he listened mostly to Son House.  He attended high school in Davenport, Iowa, before setting out across the United States and beyond learning to sing and play his brand of the blues.  He traveled to the Caribbean, where his musical education benefited from hearing Joseph Spence.

His stage name originated from a diving partner in the Virgin Islands who, having seen his efforts at swimming, nicknamed him "Catfish-Swimmin'-Around," and "Catfish-Steel-Guitar-Man."  Catfish Keith had his debut album, Catfish Blues (1984), released by Kicking Mule Records. He continued to tour constantly and picked up playing tips from watching Jessie Mae Hemphill, Henry Townsend, Johnny Shines and David "Honeyboy" Edwards.

Keith married in 1988 and founded his own record label, Fish Tail Records. 1991's Pepper in My Shoe sparked global interest in his work, and he toured both Europe and the United States.  He appeared on the cover pages of the publications Blues Life, Blueprint, Block and The Guardian, and his follow-up effort, Jitterbug Swing was nominated for a Blues Music Award.  Further acclaim was afforded by the British magazine, Blues Connection, who named him "the new slide king of the National steel guitar."

Cherry Ball (1993) saw Dirty Linen'''s James Jensen state "Catfish will give you goose bumps and leave you howling for more!"  A further Blues Music Award nomination was generated by the release of Fresh Catfish in 1995.

After Twist It Babe!, his next release was Pony Run (1999). Sweet Pea (2005) was praised by Living Blues who opined "the guitar playing is surely the main attraction here, and "Blotted Out My Mind" alone earns Catfish comparison to Frank Hovington, Elizabeth Cotten, and other virtuoso six-stringers."

In 2008, Keith was inducted into the Iowa Blues Hall of Fame.

He is an endorser of National Reso-Phonic Guitars. Catfish Keith has issued an instructional DVD entitled Dynamic Country Blues Guitar.

In 2019, his album, Reefer Hound: Viper Songs Revisited'', won acoustic album of the year honors at the Blues Blast Music Awards.

Discography

See also

 List of electric blues musicians
 List of people from Indiana
 List of singer-songwriters
 List of slide guitarists
 Music of Indiana

References

External links
 , his official website
 
 Live performance review
 Interview
Catfish Keith Interview - NAMM Oral History Library (2016)

1962 births
20th-century American singers
21st-century American singers
American blues guitarists
American male guitarists
American blues singer-songwriters
American male singer-songwriters
Electric blues musicians
Living people
People from East Chicago, Indiana
Steel guitarists
20th-century American guitarists
21st-century American guitarists
Guitarists from Indiana
20th-century American male singers
21st-century American male singers
Singer-songwriters from Indiana